Terri Minsky is an American television writer and producer who created The Geena Davis Show, Lizzie McGuire, Less Than Perfect, and Andi Mack.

Early and personal life
Minsky grew up in Mt. Lebanon, Pennsylvania. A mother of two, Minsky published a reflection, "The Mother Load," on balancing time between her work and family in Literary Mama. Minsky is Jewish.

Career
Minsky was a writer for the Wall Street Journal, the Boston Globe, the New York Daily News, Premiere, New York, and Esquire.

Minsky's first writing credits were for episodes of Doctor Doctor in 1989 and Flying Blind in 1992–1993. Minsky was the executive producer of Sherri, a Lifetime series that ran for one season in 2009. In 2014, Minsky co-wrote the pilot for MTV's Finding Carter, which debuted on July 8, 2014, and was the show's executive producer for its first season.

Minsky created and executive produced the GLAAD Award-winning Disney Channel series, Andi Mack, which began development in 2015, production in 2016, and aired from 2017 to 2019. It was also her second TV series for the Disney Channel following 2001's Lizzie McGuire.

Following the end of Andi Mack, in August 2019, it was announced that Minsky had signed a deal to create future series and films for Disney Channel and the upcoming Disney+ streaming service, as her first project under this deal being a revival of Lizzie McGuire. Minsky exited her role as showrunner of the revival on January 9, 2020 after the first two episodes of the series had been filmed due to creative differences with Disney, and the revival has since been cancelled.

Filmography

References

External links

"The Mother Load" by Terri Minsky in Literary Mama

20th-century American journalists
20th-century American women writers
21st-century American journalists
21st-century American women writers
Television producers from New York City
American television writers
American women journalists
Jewish American journalists
Jewish American writers
Esquire (magazine) people
Living people
New York (magazine) people
New York Daily News people
People from Mt. Lebanon, Pennsylvania
Place of birth missing (living people)
The Boston Globe people
The Wall Street Journal people
American women television producers
American women television writers
Writers from Pittsburgh
Year of birth missing (living people)
Screenwriters from New York (state)
Screenwriters from Pennsylvania
Television producers from Pennsylvania
20th-century American screenwriters
21st-century American screenwriters